The 2009 Incarnate Word Cardinals football team represented the University of the Incarnate Word in the 2009 NCAA Division II football season. They were led by first-year head coach Mike Santiago. The 2009 season was the inaugural season for UIW football and they competed as an NCAA Division II Independent, meaning they had no athletic conference affiliation in football for the season. Home games were played on campus at Gayle and Tom Benson Stadium. They finished the season 5–5 in their first season of intercollegiate play as a Division II Independent.

TV and radio
All Incarnate Word games were broadcast on ESPN 1250 The Zone with the voices of Paul Alexander and Trey Ware. The weekly Mike Santiago Coach’s Show was also aired live by ESPN 1250 The Zone. Coach Santiago was heard each Thursday for 13 weeks of the season beginning at 7 p.m. KUIW Internet Radio carried all Cardinals football games live while KUIW TV streamed the games live as part of the simulcast.

Schedule
Source:

Personnel
Source:

Coaching staff

Roster

Depth chart

Game summaries

Monterrey Tech

Sources: Box Score

@ Arkansas Tech

Sources: Box Score

Midwestern State

Sources: Box Score

@ Langston

Sources: Box Score

@ Oklahoma Panhandle State

Sources: Box Score

East Central

Sources: Box Score

Texas Lutheran

Sources: Box Score

@ Southwestern Assemblies of God

Sources: Box Score

Southern Arkansas

Sources: Box Score

@ Eastern New Mexico

Sources: Box Score

References

Incarnate Word
Incarnate Word Cardinals football seasons
Incarnate Word Cardinals football